Umbriatico is a comune and town in the province of Crotone, in Calabria, southern Italy. As of 2007 Umbriatico had an estimated population of 930.

History
Umbriatico was founded by the Oenotrians before the arrival of the Greek colonists who founded nearby Kroton. During the Second Punic War it had a defensive wall, but this did not prevent the Romans from storming it and massacring the population.

During the Middle Ages Umbriatico was the seat of a bishopric, which was abolished as a residential see in 1818 and brought into use as a titular diocese of the Catholic Church in 1969.

The town is now a small agricultural and livestock-breeding centre.

Sources

Cities and towns in Calabria